Rogério Mücke Ceni (born 22 January 1973) is a Brazilian professional football coach and former player who is in charge of São Paulo FC. 

He is considered one of the all-time greatest Brazilian goalkeepers and is recognised by the International Federation of Football History & Statistics as the goalkeeper to have scored the most goals in the history of football. During the height of his career (2005-2008) he was also recognized as one of the best goalkeepers in the world at the time.

Most of Ceni's vast professional career, which had spanned 25 years and 1237 professional club matches, was associated with São Paulo, with which he won 20 major titles, including three Brazilian Leagues, two Copa Libertadores and the 2005 FIFA Club World Cup. He also scored 131 goals during his career, with most of them coming from free kicks and penalties and one coming from open play.

Ceni also represented Brazil 16 times over the course of his career, being part of the squads that won the 2002 FIFA World Cup and the 1997 FIFA Confederations Cup, and also taking part at the 2006 FIFA World Cup.

Early life 

Rogério Mücke Ceni was born 22 January 1973 in Pato Branco, Paraná. Ceni is of Italian and German descent. He holds Italian citizenship.

Club career

Ceni made his senior debuts with Sinop. In 1990, the 17-year-old joined São Paulo, spending his first six seasons in Brazilian Série A as a backup or third-choice.

On 25 June 1993 Ceni made his first team debut, starting in a 4–1 win against Tenerife for the Trofeo Ciudad de Santiago de Compostela friendly championship. In the following year he was utilized as a starter in the 1994 Copa CONMEBOL, appearing in all matches as his side was crowned champions.

In the 1997 season, after Zetti moved to Santos, Ceni was chosen as his replacement. On 14 July 2005, Ceni was São Paulo's captain as the team won the 2005 Copa Libertadores, a third for the club. Two weeks later, in a match against Atlético Mineiro, he broke the record for most appearances for the team, with 618 matches – he wore a special commemorative jersey that had the number "618" printed on the back; on 25 July of the following year, he scored a penalty against Mexican side Guadalajara (also a match-winner), becoming the Tricolors all-time leading scorer in the Libertadores.

From 2005 to 2007, he scored an astonishing 47 goals in all competitions combined, as the club won two national championships and the 2005 FIFA Club World Cup; in the latter competition, he netted in the semifinals against Ittihad (3–2, through a penalty kick), and was voted Man of the match in the final against Liverpool, as well as the tournament's MVP.

On 20 August 2006, Ceni scored his 63rd and record-breaking goal by netting a free kick against Cruzeiro in the domestic league, a few minutes after denying a penalty to the opposition. Later in the same match, he scored a goal from the spot and took his total to 64, also tying the match 2–2; this put him two goals ahead of the previous holder, Paraguayan José Luis Chilavert.

On 29 October 2006, Ceni made his 700th official appearance for São Paulo, against Figueirense in a 2–0 victory. Some of the gloss was taken off the occasion when the player was ordered to change his bright yellow jersey because it matched with the referee's; at the end of the 2007 season, which ended in league conquest, he was voted by the Brazilian Football Confederation as the Best Player.

In April 2009, Ceni fractured his ankle in training, being initially sidelined for six months, but recovering sooner than expected. On 28 October 2010, against Atlético Paranaense, he played his 700th game as club captain. The following year, on 27 March, he scored from a free kick to win the match against arch rivals Corinthians, shooting from 18 metres for his 100th goal.

On 7 September 2011, Ceni made his 1000th appearance for São Paulo. In late January of the following year, the 39-year-old underwent an operation on his shoulder, losing six months of competition.

On 1 August 2012, Ceni returned to the field, scoring from a direct free kick in a 2–0 Copa Sudamericana away win against Bahia; his side went on to win that year's tournament. He subsequently scored three goals in the league, ending the campaign as a starter.

Despite already being aged 40, Ceni stated that his spirit for competition was the same as an eighteen-year-old's, but still stating that his recovery is harder than years ago. On 14 July 2013, Ceni scored his 111th goal from a free kick in a 2–3 loss at Vitória.

On 7 December 2013, after lengthy negotiations, Ceni renewed his contract with Tricolor for a further season. On 20 April 2014, in a 3–0 home win against Botafogo, he had three records recognized by Guinness World Records: most goals scored by a goalkeeper, number of games played for the same club and number of times as captain.

On 27 October 2014, Ceni broke Ryan Giggs' record for most wins at a single club after playing in São Paulo's 3–0 win over Goiás. He finished the campaign with eight league goals (his best goal scoring record within seven years), being an undisputed starter.

On 28 November 2014, Ceni signed a new deal with São Paulo, until August 2015, despite previously stating that he would retire at the end of the season. On 29 March 2015, after scoring in a 3–0 home win against Linense, he surpassed Marcelinho Carioca in the number of goals scored by direct free kicks for only one club, with Ceni having 60 and Marcelinho, 59.

In June 2015, Ceni scored his 128th goal, entering in the club's top 10 goalscorers list. Ceni announced his retirement from professional football on 6 December 2015.

International career
A Brazilian international for nine years, Ceni collected 16 caps. He was selected to the squads that won the 1997 FIFA Confederations Cup and the 2002 FIFA World Cup (and the 2006 World Cup, still not fully recovered from knee surgery), but only appeared in two games in final stages, the 3–2 win against Mexico in the first tournament and the 4–1 triumph over Japan in the third.

Coaching career
In December 2016, Ceni was appointed as São Paulo coach, with Englishman Michael Beale and Frenchman Charles Hembert joining as his assistants. On 3 July 2017, after poor results - São Paulo were eliminated in State League, Brazilian Cup and 2017 Copa Sudamericana into a period of one month and are in relegation zone in Brazilian League, he was sacked.

Ceni signed with Fortaleza to coach the team in 2018. On 3 November of that year, Fortaleza clinched promotion to the Série A, and seven days later, the club clinched the Série B title for the first time in its history. In 2019, Fortaleza also won the Campeonato Cearense and the Copa do Nordeste.

On 11 August 2019, Ceni was named Cruzeiro head coach, but was dismissed on 26 September, after having altercations with the club's main players, specifically Thiago Neves and Dedé.

Three days later, Ceni was announced at his former side Fortaleza, replacing fired Zé Ricardo. On 22 October 2020, he again won the Ceará state title, his fourth title with Fortaleza.

On 10 November 2020, Ceni agreed to a contract with Flamengo until December 2021, replacing the sacked Domènec Torrent. He won the 2020 Série A with the club, but was sacked on 10 July 2021.

Ceni returned to São Paulo on 13 October 2021, being named head coach in the place of Hernán Crespo.

Style of play
A dead-ball specialist, Ceni was the official taker of free kicks and penalties for São Paulo from 1997 until his retirement, a time period in which he scored 131 goals. In addition to his accurate set-pieces, prolific goalscoring, distribution, and ability with the ball at his feet, he was also known as an excellent goalkeeper and shot-stopper, and stood out for his determination and longevity throughout his career, as he retired at over 40 years of age. Ceni was known for being capable of producing brilliant saves, such as those in the final of the 2005 FIFA Club World Cup, which saw São Paulo defeat Liverpool 1–0; for his performances, Ceni later won the Golden Ball, which is awarded to the competition's best player. He is considered to be one of Brazil's greatest goalkeepers ever.

Career statistics
Club

International

Coaching statistics

Honours
PlayerSinopCampeonato Mato-Grossense: 1990São PauloCampeonato Brasileiro Série A: 2006, 2007, 2008
Campeonato Paulista: 1998, 2000, 2005
Supercampeonato Paulista: 2002
Torneio Rio – São Paulo: 2001
Copa Libertadores: 2005
Copa Sudamericana: 2012
Copa CONMEBOL: 1994
Copa Master de CONMEBOL: 1996
Intercontinental Cup: 1993
FIFA Club World Cup: 2005BrazilFIFA World Cup: 2002
FIFA Confederations Cup: 1997IndividualBola de Prata: 2000, 2003, 2004, 2006, 2007, 2008
Bola de Ouro: 2008
Copa Libertadores Best Player: 2005
FIFA Club World Cup Golden Ball: 2005
FIFA Club World Cup MVP of the Final Match Trophy: 2005
Campeonato Brasileiro Série A Player of the Year: 2006, 2007
Campeonato Brasileiro Série A Team of the Year: 2006, 2007
IFFHS World's Highest Scoring Goalkeeper of the 21st Century 2001–2020

CoachFortalezaCampeonato Brasileiro Série B: 2018
Campeonato Cearense: 2019, 2020
Copa do Nordeste: 2019Flamengo Campeonato Brasileiro Série A: 2020
Supercopa do Brasil: 2021
Campeonato Carioca: 2021São Paulo Florida Cup: 2017Individual'
Campeonato Cearense Best Coach: 2019, 2020
Campeonato Paulista Best Coach: 2022
Bola de Prata: 2020

See also 
 List of goals scored by Rogério Ceni
 List of men's footballers with the most official appearances
 List of goalscoring goalkeepers

References

External links
São Paulo official profile 
 

IFFHS Top Division goal scorer ranking among goalkeepers

1973 births
Living people
People from Pato Branco
Brazilian people of German descent
Brazilian people of Italian descent
Brazilian footballers
Association football goalkeepers
Sinop Futebol Clube players
São Paulo FC players
Campeonato Brasileiro Série A players
Brazil international footballers
1997 FIFA Confederations Cup players
2002 FIFA World Cup players
2006 FIFA World Cup players
Copa Libertadores-winning players
FIFA Confederations Cup-winning players
FIFA World Cup-winning players
Brazilian football managers
São Paulo FC managers
Fortaleza Esporte Clube managers
Cruzeiro Esporte Clube managers
CR Flamengo managers
Campeonato Brasileiro Série A managers
Campeonato Brasileiro Série B managers
Citizens of Italy through descent
Sportspeople from Paraná (state)